HMCS Cape Scott was a . She was built for the Royal Navy as HMS Beachy Head in 1944. She was loaned to the Royal Netherlands Navy in 1947 as HNLMS Vulkaan and returned to the Royal Navy in 1950. She was sold to the Royal Canadian Navy in 1952 and served until 1975, used as an alongside repair depot after decommissioning.

Design and description
The vessels were propelled by one shaft driven by a reciprocating triple expansion steam engine powered by steam from two Foster Wheeler boilers, creating . The vessels had a complement of 270.

While in British service the vessel was armed with sixteen single-mounted Oerlikon 20 mm cannons. Upon conversion to a mobile repair ship, the vessels were equipped with landing pads for Sikorsky H04S helicopters situated aft. A decompression chamber was installed and shops for multiple trades such as engineering, diesel engine repair, sheet metal welding, coppersmith and electronic repair among others were created within the ship. The vessels were also equipped with an eight-berth hospital, sick bay, X-ray room, medical lab, dental clinic and lab.

Service history

Royal Navy and Royal Netherlands Navy
The ship was ordered by the Royal Navy during the Second World War as a modified Fort ship design and was laid down on 8 June 1944 by Burrard Dry Dock at their Vancouver shipyard. Beachy Head was launched on 27 September 1944 and was commissioned into the Royal Navy on 20 March 1945. After short service with the Royal Navy, the vessel was loaned to the Royal Netherlands Navy in 1947 for use as a repair ship and renamed Vulkaan. Netherlands returned the ship to the Royal Navy in 1950, where she returned to her old name Beachy Head.

Royal Canadian Navy
Beachy Head was acquired by the Royal Canadian Navy in 1952 and renamed Cape Scott in 1953. The ship lay alongside in Halifax, Nova Scotia used as classroom ship and providing auxiliary services in the harbour. The ship was sent for a refit at Saint John, New Brunswick and commissioned on 28 January 1959. In January 1960, the ship deployed to Bermuda as headquarters ship for the Canadian warships from Atlantic Command performing naval exercises in the Caribbean Sea during the winter months. During the deployment, Cape Scott transported six Sikorsky H04S and one Bell helicopters to Bermuda. She returned to Halifax in March. In October 1960, Cape Scott took part in the NATO naval exercise Sweep Clear V off Shelburne, Nova Scotia.

In 1964 Cape Scott was engaged in a civilian medical mission to Rapa Nui in the south Pacific Ocean, called the Medical Expedition to Easter Island (METEI). Carrying nearly 40 doctors and technicians and 20 prefabricated shelters, Cape Scott was refitted to increase fuel capacity from 4,441 to 9,000 barrels, and enlarge the forward hatch to handle large cargoes.

The ship was homeported at Halifax until paid off into reserve on 1 July 1970. In 1972, the ship was redesignated Fleet Maintenance Group (Atlantic) and remained as such until 1975, when the group was moved ashore. The ship was sold for scrap in 1977 and broken up in Texas in 1978.

References

Citations

Sources

External links
 Cape class

Auxiliary ships of the Royal Canadian Navy
Cape-class maintenance ships
1944 ships